This is a list of LGBT rights organizations in the United States. It does not include LGBT organizations affiliated with political parties.

National

Alabama 
 Equality Alabama

Arkansas 
 Center for Artistic Revolution

Arizona 
Equality Arizona

California 
 Californians Against Hate
 Courage Campaign
 EQCA (Equality California)
 GALAS LGBTQ+ Armenian Society
 Lavender Panthers (defunct)
 Los Angeles LGBT Center
 Love Honor Cherish
 Marriage Equality California (defunct)
 Society for Individual Rights (probably defunct)
 Trans-e-motion
 Trikone

Colorado 
 The Pink Panthers

Connecticut 
 Equality Connecticut
 Love Makes a Family (Connecticut) (defunct)

Florida 
Equality Florida
The Pride Center at Equality Park
SAVE Dade

Georgia 
 Georgia Equality

Hawaii 
 Equality Hawaii

Illinois 
 The Civil Rights Agenda
 Equality Illinois
 Society for Human Rights (defunct)

Iowa 
 One Iowa

Kansas 
 Kansas Equality Coalition
 Simply Equal

Kentucky 
 Fairness Campaign
 Kentucky Equality Federation
 Kentucky Fairness Alliance (defunct)

Louisiana 
 Forum for Equality
 Louisiana Electorate of Gays And Lesbians (defunct)

Maine 
 EqualityMaine

Maryland 
 Equality Maryland
 Gender Rights Maryland
 Maryland Coalition for Trans Equality

Massachusetts 
 Harvard Gay & Lesbian Caucus
 Knowthyneighbor.org
 Massachusetts Transgender Political Coalition
 MassEquality

Michigan 
 Equality Michigan
 Michigan Equality (defunct)
 Michigan Organization for Human Rights (defunct)
 Triangle Foundation (defunct)

Minnesota 
 OutFront Minnesota

Mississippi 
 Equality Mississippi
 Mississippi Safe Schools Coalition

Missouri 
 Missourians for Equality
 PROMO

New Jersey 
 Garden State Equality

New York 
 African Ancestral Lesbians United for Societal Change
 Audre Lorde Project
 Empire State Pride Agenda (defunct)
 Fed Up Queers (defunct)
 Gay Activists Alliance (defunct)
 Marriage Equality New York (defunct)
 New York Area Bisexual Network
 New Yorkers United for Marriage
 Sex Panic!
 Street Transvestite Action Revolutionaries (defunct)
 Sylvia Rivera Law Project

North Carolina 
 Equality North Carolina
 North Carolina Religious Coalition for Marriage Equality (defunct)

North Dakota 
 Ten Percent Society

Ohio 
 Equality Ohio

Oklahoma 
 Cimarron Alliance Foundation

Oregon 
 Basic Rights Oregon

Pennsylvania 
 Equality Pennsylvania

Tennessee 
 Tennessee Equality Project
 Tennessee Transgender Political Coalition

Texas 
 Equality Texas
 Houston GLBT Political Caucus (HGLBTPC)
 Queer Liberaction
 Austin Black Pride (defunct)

Utah 
 Equality Utah
 Stonewall Shooting Sports of Utah

Washington (state) 
 Citizens for Fairness Hands Off Washington (defunct)
 Equal Rights Washington
 Washington Families Standing Together (defunct)
 Washington United for Marriage (defunct)
 Gender Justice League

Washington, D.C. 
 Gay and Lesbian Activists Alliance (GLAA)

Wisconsin 
 Equality Wisconsin

See also

References

Lists of organizations based in the United States
 
Rights,United States
LGBT,United States